Pulse 3 (also known as Pulse 3: Invasion) is a 2008 American horror film written and directed by Joel Soisson. Rider Strong and Brittany Finamore star as two people who begin chatting online in a post-apocalyptic society where technology is forbidden. It is a sequel to Pulse 2: Afterlife and the third and final installment of the Pulse trilogy.

The film was released straight-to-DVD on December 23, 2008.

Plot 
Seven years into the invasion after Adam's (Rider Strong) Egyptian girlfriend Salwa (Noureen DeWulf) got hit by an infection, causing her to commit suicide, humankind has fled the cities, where billions have died from a plague that is spread through the Internet. Justine (Brittany Finamore) dreams of a life beyond her squalid refugee camp, where all technology is taboo. She discovers the last working laptop and opens it like Pandora's box. Someone is waiting for her online, and that someone wants desperately to meet her, who is revealed to be Adam through an Internet chat. The only catch: she must return to the city. With a longing that surpasses fear, Justine embarks on a terrifying journey back to the heart of where it all began. What waits there is something that she could not possibly have imagined. Towards the end of the movie, Justine reunites with Adam, but he was the only person who had not got the plague, resulting in him avoiding to care about "anything but himself". Justine smashes the working laptop and unplugs the USB flash drive from the slot, before encountering some Internet ghosts trying to get her. The unexpected explosions appear, making the ghosts disappear and go through Adam's body. He is then killed by the ghosts and the invasion ends with a voice-over from Justine.

Cast

Production 
This film and Pulse 2: Afterlife were shot back-to-back in Shreveport, Louisiana.

Release 
Pulse 3 was released on DVD in the United States on December 23, 2008.

Reception 
Bill Gibron of PopMatters rated it 3/10 stars and wrote that the series has now become a "holding dock for dull horror clichés". In comparing it to the original Japanese film, Gibron called it "too little, too late" for becoming a small, personal character study instead of exploring deeper themes.  At DVD Talk, Justin Felix rated it 1.5/5 stars and wrote that the focus on teenage angst makes it only interesting to die-hard fans.

References

External links
 
 

2008 films
2008 direct-to-video films
2008 horror films
2008 psychological thriller films
2000s science fiction horror films
American thriller films
American science fiction horror films
2000s English-language films
American ghost films
American supernatural horror films
American dystopian films
American post-apocalyptic films
Direct-to-video sequel films
Films directed by Joel Soisson
Films with screenplays by Joel Soisson
Films scored by Elia Cmíral
2000s American films